Jean Dubuc (born March 8, 1941) is a businessman and former Quebec politician. He represented La Prairie in the Quebec National Assembly from 2003 to 2007 as a Liberal.

Born in Saint-Isidore, Quebec, the son of Antonio Dubuc and Marie-Jeanne Bouchard, he was educated in Delson. Dubuc served on the municipal council for Delson from 1976 to 1980. He was defeated when he ran for reelection in 2007.

References 
 

1941 births
Quebec Liberal Party MNAs
Living people
21st-century Canadian politicians